The 1983–84 Elitserien season was the ninth season of the Elitserien, the top level of ice hockey in Sweden. 10 teams participated in the league, and AIK won the championship.

Standings

Playoffs

External links
Swedish Hockey League seasons official site

Swedish Hockey League seasons
1983–84 in Swedish ice hockey
Swedish